Lecithocera linocoma is a moth in the family Lecithoceridae. It was described by Edward Meyrick in 1916. It is found in northern Australia.

The wingspan is about 9 mm. The forewings are rather dark grey irrorated (sprinkled) with whitish. The discal stigmata are blackish and the margin is irregularly blackish around the apex and upper part of the termen. The hindwings are light grey.

References

Moths described in 1916
linocoma